The southern lemon sole (Pelotretis flavilatus), also known as the New Zealand lemon sole, is a righteye flounder, the only species in the genus Pelotretis, found around New Zealand in enclosed waters such as estuaries, harbours, mudflats, and sandflats, in waters less than 385 m in depth.  Their length is from 25 to 50 cm.

References

 
 Tony Ayling & Geoffrey Cox, Collins Guide to the Sea Fishes of New Zealand,  (William Collins Publishers Ltd, Auckland, New Zealand 1982) 

Pleuronectidae
Endemic marine fish of New Zealand
Fish described in 1911